This is a list of Spanish television related events from 1963.

Events
 22 September: Salomé and Raimon win the Mediterranean Song Contest, with the catalan language song S'en va anar.

Births
 3 January – Marta Calvó, actress.
 14 January – Rosa María Molló, journalist.
 22 January – Sergio Sauca, sport journalist.
 2 February – Gonzalo de Castro, actor.
 14 February – Elisenda Roca, hostess.
 12 March – José Luis Fernández, actor.
 23 March – Miguel Ortiz, actor and host.
 26 March – Amparo Larrañaga, actress.
 17 April – Pedro Casablanc, actor.
 25 April- Mónica Ridruejo, Director General of RTVE.
 26 April – María del Monte, singer and hostess.
 3 May – Roberto Cairo, actor.
 2 June – Pepe Viyuela, actor.
 12 June – Mari Pau Domínguez, hostess.
 13 June – Alaska, actress, singer and hostess.
 15 June – Blanca Portillo, actress.
 17 June – Daniel Écija, productor.
 24 June – Antonio Montero, journalist.
 30 June – Marta Robles, hostess.
 9 July – Beatriz Cortázar, journalist.
 10 July – Vicente Vallés, journalist.
 25 July – Cristina Torres, actress.
 19 August – Patxi Alonso, host.
 29 August – Belinda Washington, hostess and actress.
 3 September – Teresa Viejo, hostess.
 7 September – Àngels Barceló, journalist.
 21 September – Carmen Machi, actress.
 23 September – Sonia Martínez, hostess.
 26 September – Jordi González, host.
 30 September – Irma Soriano, hostess.
 7 October – Concha Galán, hostess.
 8 October – Jorge Cadaval, comedian.
 6 November – Bruno Squarcia, actor.
 26 November – Lydia Bosch, actress and hostess.
 27 November – Micky Molina, actor.
 28 November – Fernando Acaso, host.
 30 November – Pepa Bueno, journalist.
 12 December – Inmaculada Galván, hostess.
 19 December – Cristina Marcos, actress.
 Candela Palazón, hostess.
 María San Juan, hostess.
 Montserrat Domínguez, hostess.
 Paloma García-Pelayo, journalist.
 Tonino, comedian.

See also
1963 in Spain
List of Spanish films of 1963

References